The Brunswick Fire Station and Flats, located at 24 Blyth Street, Brunswick, Victoria, Australia, was constructed in 1937–1938. Designed by Seabrook and Fildes, it was the first fire station commissioned by the Melbourne Metropolitan Fire Brigade to embrace a Modernist ideology.

Seabrook's father, who was Chairman of the Metropolitan Fire Brigade at the time, was no doubt influential in ensuring his son's practice was awarded the contract, the first of twelve the firm designed which included the stations at Camberwell (1938), Brighton (1939) and Windsor (1941).

Description

The Brunswick Fire Station incorporates 2 vehicle spaces with 2 large doors facing Blyth Street, a watch room, toilets and offices. At the time of construction the station boasted state-of-the-art fire fighting equipment and alarm systems.

The planning reflects a functionalist sensibility, where the station's various activities are organised into zones that are expressed externally in a series of interlocking cubic forms. The building's keynote vertical element, for instance, conceals the main staircase and boldly protrudes beyond the façade, bearing the station's flagpole. Although telephony had long surpassed spotters as the means of detecting blazes, this tower is evocative of pre-Federation days when stations such as Smith and Johnson's Eastern Hill Fire Station in East Melbourne (1891–1893) were invariably positioned on high ground, and denotes the building's important and enduring civic presence.

The accommodation for the firemen and their families was originally located in two separate two-storey residential blocks of flats at the rear of the main building. Sizeable garden courtyards were positioned between the flats and station, providing abundant northern light to the residences. Ground floor planter boxes further enhanced the connection between home and landscape.

With the introduction of shift work, the need for resident fire fighters disappeared. Only the southernmost residential block remains, located on the corner of Burchett and Barningham Streets.

Key Influences and Design Approach

The most noteworthy exponents of the Inter-War Functionalist style in Australia were young architects who in their formative years had made trips to Europe. Norman Seabrook was one such professional, and along with his practice partner Alan Fildes, played an invaluable, but often unstated role in the development of Modernist architecture in Melbourne.

In the decades prior to Seabrook and Fildes' first fire station project, polite Georgian revivalist designs were the norm for the Melbourne Metropolitan Fire Brigade, often resembling overblown houses featuring squat red brick walls and hipped roofs with prominent eaves. The Brunswick design irrevocably broke this mould.

Numerous historians point to Willem Dudok's Hilversum Town Hall as the major influence on Seabrook and Fildes' aesthetic, particularly in the firm's adoption of De-Stijl decompositional techniques. This is clearly evident is Brunswick station's use of prismatic forms, horizontal window banding, cantilevered hoods over fenestrations, flat roofs and minimal ornamentation save for the striking sans serif lettering above the garage doors. Cream brickwork is also strongly associated with Dutch Modernism, however here its usage has special significance, as this colour was first introduced to the local market by Brunswick brick maker John Glew in the 1850s.

In the 1930s eclecticism pervaded apartment design in Melbourne, with practitioners such as Howard Lawson, Roy Grounds and Taylor, Soilleux and Overend seeking to overcome Australia's long standing prejudice against high-density living by promoting economical but contemporary solutions that adopted variously, and often in the one project, Modernist, Moderne, Georgian revivalist and Californian inspired styles.

Seabrook and Fildes, however, stuck resolutely to their Modernist principles, incorporating the ideas of Frank Lloyd Wright and the International Style in their flat designs with elements such as sizable expanses of glass, built-in furniture and direct engagement with the surrounding landscape. The Brunswick site's two rectilinear apartment blocks were orientated in the zeilenbau style, that is parallel to each other and aligned at right angles to Burchett Street. Dating back to the German municipal estates of the 1920s, the aim of this layout was to provide maximum sunlight, airflow and quietude, with equal access to the grounds for all inhabitants.

The logical simplicity of the Brunswick design influenced numerous contemporaries, as seen at Winbush's fire station in Kew (1941) and Henderson and Cuthbert's fire station in Forrest, Canberra (1939).

Awards

The Brunswick Fire Station and Flats was gazetted on the Victorian Heritage Register on 6 May 1992. It has also been cited by the National Trust of Australia.
It was recognized by the Moreland City Council.

References

External links 
 National Trust of Australia

Fire stations completed in 1938
Fire stations in Victoria (Australia)
Heritage-listed buildings in Melbourne
Buildings and structures in the City of Merri-bek
1938 establishments in Australia